George Ambler Wilson, CBE, MICE (1906–1977) was a British civil engineer.

Wilson was born in Wellington, Shropshire in 1906. He was the chief engineer of the Port of London Authority from 1953 to 1967.  In 1958 he was elected a member of the Smeatonian Society of Civil Engineers. He also served as president of the Institution of Civil Engineers from November 1971 to November 1972. He died in 1977 and the National Portrait Gallery in London holds two images of him.

Wilson was honoured in the Queens 1967 birthday honours and appointed a CBE in the Civil Division.

Family 
Wilson has 4 daughter from two marriages.

In 1970, Georges daughter Gail Wilson married her LSE colleague, Meghnad Desai, They had three children together.

References

Bibliography 

        
        
        
        
        
        

British civil engineers
Presidents of the Institution of Civil Engineers
1906 births
1977 deaths
People from Wellington, Shropshire